Gargantua is a limestone cave located on the Andy Good Plateau in Alberta and British Columbia, Canada.  it has  of passages with a depth of .

In October 2002, a group of caving club students from W. R. Myers High School were trapped in the cave overnight, after failing to break through the waterfall exit.

References

External links

Caves of British Columbia
Limestone caves
Wild caves